The 2021 season was the 14th season for the Indian Premier League franchise Mumbai Indians. They were one of the eight teams competed in the 2021 Indian Premier League. Mumbai Indians were the defending champions, but cannot defend their title after they finished in the 5th position and edging behind Kolkata Knight Riders net run-rate at the end of the league stage. The team was captained by Rohit Sharma with Mahela Jayawardene as team coach.

Background

Player retention and transfers 

The Mumbai Indians retained 18 players and released seven players.

Retained Players: Rohit Sharma, Aditya Tare, Anmolpreet Singh, Anukul Roy, Dhawal Kulkarni, Hardik Pandya, Ishan Kishan, Jasprit Bumrah, Jayant Yadav, Kieron Pollard, Krunal Pandya, Quinton de Kock, Rahul Chahar, Suryakumar Yadav, Trent Boult, Chris Lynn, Saurabh Tiwary, Mohsin Khan

Released Players: Prince Balwant Rai, Digvijay Deshmukh, Lasith Malinga, Nathan Coulter-Nile, James Pattinson, Sherfane Rutherford, Mitchell McClenaghan.

Added Players:Piyush Chawla, James Neesham, Marco Jansen, Yudhvir Charak, Nathan Coulter-Nile, Adam Milne, Arjun Tendulkar

Squad
 Players with international caps are listed in bold.

Administration and support staff

Kit manufacturers and sponsors

|

Teams and standings

Results by match

League stage

The full schedule was published on the IPL website on 7 March 2021.

Matches

Statistics

Most runs

 Last updated: 10 October 2021 
 Source:Cricinfo

Most wickets

 Last updated: 10 October 2021
 Source:Cricinfo

Player of the match awards

References

External links
Official Website

Mumbai Indians seasons
2021 Indian Premier League